Maa...Tomay Chara Ghum Asena, also called Maa (English: Mother), was a Bengali television serial telecast by Star Jalsha. It was produced by Shree Venkatesh Films. The show narrated the bond between mother and daughter. It is one of the longest-running Bengali television series and Star Jalsha's longest-running serial.

Premise
It is the story of a mother, Pratima Mukherjee and her daughter, Jhilik. When young, Jhilik gets kidnapped which leads to Pratima getting separated from her. For years, Jhilik is raised by a female-kidnapper. Circumstances soon lead to Jhilik and Pratima once again meeting after several years. From then, the story is completely based on how Jhilik once again accepts Pratima in her life.

Cast

Main 
Tithi Bose as Pari  Mukherjee aka Jhilik - Pratima and Manish's daughter
Sohena Roy as child Pari
Sreetama Bhattacharjee as Diya - fake Jhilik; Angshu's former love interest and Raj's childhood love-turned-wife
 Mahua Halder as Pratima Mukherjee, Pari's mother

Recurring 
Bhaswar Chatterjee as Manish Mukherjee, Pari's father
 Chhanda Karanjee as Mamata
 Chandicharan as Harishankar Mukherjee- Mamata's husband
 Saswata Chatterjee as Bhaswati's husband
 Anindita Saha Kapileshwari as Bhaswati Chatterjee
 Rita Dutta Chakraborty as Arati Mukherjee
 Aritra Dutta as Dipu, Pari's uncle and Arati's son
 Aparajita Adhya as Pratima Roy Chowdhury
 Anindya Chatterjee as Rajdeep Roy (Raj), Diya's childhood love-turned-husband and Pari's love interest
 Dolon Roy as Mohini Chatterjee
 Sourav Das as Rik Chatterjee
 Ena Saha as Atish's wife
 Chandraniv Mukherjee as Atish, the youngest son of Mukherjee family
 Sujata Dawn as Aheli, the youngest daughter of Mukherjee family
 Soma Chakraborty as Hira Amma
 Sonali Chowdhury as Rajeswari :Diya's Aunt
 Ashmita Chakraborty as Fulki
 Bhavana Banerjee as child Fulki
 Aritram Mukherjee as Aditya Roychowdhury, Fulki's husband and Pratima's son
 Rohit Mukherjee as Pari's uncle
 Ritoja Majumder as Bidisha
 Amitava Bhattacharyya as Doctor
 Rajiv Bose as Arunangshu Mukherjee (Angshu), Jhilik's/Diya's ex lover
 Biswajit Chakraborty as Samaresh Chatterjee, Diya's father
 Shankar Chakraborty as Sports teacher
 Priyanka Bhattacharjee as Babli

Production 
The show was produced by Shree Venkatesh Films. For three years it was the highest rated show on Star Jalsha. The serial ended on August 3, 2014. The episode featured stars of other serials as well as film personalities like Koel Mallick and Raj Chakraborty.

Adaptations

Awards 
The soap won many awards at the Tele Cine Awards, Star Jalsha awards and the Tele Samman Awards. Some of them are:

 Best Actress - Sritama Bhattacharjee (at the 13th Tele Cine Awards)
 Best Performance - Soma Chakraborty (at the 13th Tele Cine Awards)

References

External links
 

Indian television shows
Bengali-language television programming in India
2009 Indian television series debuts
2014 Indian television series endings
Star Jalsha original programming